Euchromia schoutedeni is a species of moth in the subfamily Arctiinae. It is found in the Democratic Republic of Congo.

References

Moths described in 1936
Euchromiina
Endemic fauna of the Democratic Republic of the Congo